Euchloe belemia, the green-striped white, is a butterfly in the family Pieridae. Its range is northern Africa, Arabia (Oman, United Arab Emirates) and the southern Iberian peninsula, especially Spain and Portugal.

Adults are on wing from February to June.

The larvae feed on Sisymbrium species (including Sisymbrium bourgeanum), Diplotaxis tennuisiliqua and Biscutella didyma.

Subspecies

Euchloe belemia hesperidum Rothschild 1913
Euchloe belemia eversi Eversi 1963
Euchloe belemia abyssinica Stamm 1928 (Ethiopia, Somalia)
Euchloe belemia belemia, Esper,1800 (Oman, United Arab Emirates)
Euchloe belemia palaestinensis Rüber 1907

References 

Euchloe
Butterflies described in 1800
Butterflies of Africa
Butterflies of Europe
Butterflies of Asia
Taxa named by Eugenius Johann Christoph Esper